Manfred Danklmaier was an Austrian luger who competed in the 1980s. A natural track luger, he won two medals at the FIL European Luge Natural Track Championships with a gold in singles (1985) and a bronze in doubles (1981).

References
Natural track European Championships results 1970-2006.

Austrian male lugers
Living people
Year of birth missing (living people)